Collisional cascading may refer to:
 Collision cascade, collisions of atoms induced by an energetic particle in a solid or liquid
 Kessler syndrome or collisional cascading